Daniel Escriche Romero (born 24 March 1998) is a Spanish footballer who plays for Albacete Balompié, on loan from SD Huesca. Mainly a forward, he can also play as a winger.

Club career
Born in Burriana, Castellón, Valencian Community, Escriche joined CD Castellón's youth setup in 2015 from Club Burriana FB. After being initially assigned to the Juvenil squad, he made his senior debut with the reserves in the regional leagues, scoring his first goal on 22 November of that year in a 6–1 home routing of Vinaròs CF.

Escriche made his first team debut for Castellón on 3 January 2016 with the age of 17 years and 284 days, coming on as a second-half substitute in a 3–0 Tercera División home win against CF Recambios Colón. On 9 August he signed for CD Lugo, returning to youth football.

On 27 May 2017 Escriche made his professional debut, replacing Iriome in a 0–1 away loss against SD Huesca in the Segunda División championship. On 17 December, he scored a hat-trick for the farm team in a 5–1 home routing of SD Outeiro de Rei.

Escriche scored his first professional goal on 22 April 2018, netting the opener in a 1–1 home draw against Lorca FC. On 15 July, he signed a four-year deal with La Liga side SD Huesca, being immediately loaned back to Lugo for the 2018–19 campaign.

Escriche returned to Huesca for the 2019–20 season, with the club now also in the second division. On 20 January 2020, he was loaned to Elche CF in the same category, until June. Upon returning, he was a part of the Oscenses main squad also in La Liga, and made his debut in the category on 20 September 2020 by replacing David Ferreiro in a 0–2 home loss against Cádiz CF.

Escriche scored his first goal in the main category of Spanish football on 21 February 2021, netting the equalizer in a 3–2 home success over Granada CF. He featured in 23 league matches during the campaign, as the club suffered relegation.

On 30 January 2023, Escriche was loaned to second division side Albacete Balompié, until the end of the season.

References

External links

1998 births
Living people
People from Plana Baixa
Sportspeople from the Province of Castellón
Spanish footballers
Footballers from the Valencian Community
Association football wingers
Association football forwards
La Liga players
Segunda División players
Tercera División players
Divisiones Regionales de Fútbol players
CD Castellón footballers
CD Lugo players
Polvorín FC players
SD Huesca footballers
Elche CF players
Albacete Balompié players